García López de Cárdenas y Figueroa was a Spanish conquistador who was the first European to see the Grand Canyon.

Life 
Cárdenas was born in Llerena, Crown of Castile, second son to Alonso de Cárdenas, 1st Count of La Puebla del Maestre, and wife Maria García Osorio. He was the Encomiendador of Caravaca.

López de Cárdenas was a conquistador attached to the exploits of Francisco Vázquez de Coronado. Expeditions, including one led by Pedro de Tovar, had heard reports of a large river north of Cíbola (Zuñi). Cárdenas was dispatched in September 1540 by the general stationed in Cíbola with the express mission of locating such a river and returning within 80 days. Pedro de Sotomayor accompanied him to record the event as a cronista. After some twenty days of marching in a northerly direction, he was successful; but his band found difficulties in reaching the river (which was the current Colorado River, that they called River Tizon), owing to the sheer vertical distance down from their position. They were standing on the South Rim of the Grand Canyon. After several days of failed attempts to descend to the water (his men were suffering from dehydration), his party was forced to return to Cíbola.

Cárdenas was the only member of the Coronado Expedition to be convicted of war crimes afterward because of his role in the brutal Tiguex War.

See also
 Age of Discovery
 Francisco Vázquez de Coronado

References 

 Winship, George Parker. (1990) The Journey of Coronado, 1540-1542 (Fulcrum Series in American History). p. 12. .

People from Campiña Sur (Badajoz)
Spanish explorers of North America
Extremaduran conquistadors
Year of death unknown
Year of birth unknown
16th-century Spanish people
Spanish conquistadors
Explorers of the United States